Abdullahi Qarshe (1924–1994) was a Somali musician, poet and playwright known as the "Father of Somali music". In 1957 he wrote and composed the Somali National Anthem, Qolobaa Calankeed.

Biography

Early life
Qarshe was born in 1924 in the Somali expatriate community in Moshi, Tanzania. He belonged to the Mousa Arreh subdivision of the Habar Yoonis sub clan of Garhajis Isaaq that mainly inhabits the Togdheer region of Somaliland. Before migrating to Tanzania, his family was based in the town of Maydh, in the Sanaag region in eastern Somaliland, where they were the keepers of the tomb of Shaykh Ishaaq, the common progenitor of the wider Isaaq clan family.

In 1931, at the behest of his family, he left Tanzania and settled in Aden, Yemen for his education, where he subsequently memorized the entire Quran. It is in Aden where Abdullahi also had his first encounter with cinema and radio playing western films and Indian and Arabic music, which inspired him to buy a lute to accomplish his new goal of creating music in the Somali language. He was married to Adaiya Qarshe whom he had four children with, Rukiyo Qarshe, Safiyo Qarshe, Anab Qarshe and Mahad Qarshe.

Career
Qarshe, along with other first generation artists such as Ali Feiruz and Mohamed Nahari, was among the pioneers of modern Somali music. An innovative musician, Qarshe often employed a wide variety of instruments in his art, such as the guitar, piano and oud. He was also known for his poems and his theatrical work at Mogadishu and Hargeisa venues.

The Balwo genre, was however founded by Abdi Sinimo as was mentioned by Qarshe. In an interview with Abdullahi Qarshe published by Bildhaan Vol. 2 page 80, he affirmed that "modern music was in the air at the time of Abdi Sinimo, who is widely regarded as the genius who formulated and organized it into the belwo and thus took well deserved credit and honor for it."

Heellooy
Qarshe introduced a new and shorter form of Heello by combining traditional Somali poetry with song. In the 1940s he created his first song Ka ka'ay (Arise). Qarshe utilized many of his Heello songs to express  Pro-independence and anti-colonial sentiments.  In tribute to Patrice Lumumba he wrote the song Lumumba ma noole mana dhimane (Lumumba is neither alive nor dead) in 1960 . In 1957 he composed the current Somali National Anthem Qoloba Calankeeda waa cayn (Every nation has its own unique flag). In 1955 Qarshe founded the Walaalo Hargeisa troupe which performed various plays around Somalia, one of them being Soomaalidii Hore iyo Somaalidii dambe  (Somalis past and present). Qarshe's 1961 song Aqoon la'aan waa iftiin la'aan(to be without knowledge is to be without light) was the signature tune of Radio Mogadishu. In addition, Qarshe was a member of the pioneering Somali musical ensemble Waaberi and would influence nearly all subsequent Heellooy.

See also
Waaberi
Radio Hargeisa
Music of Somalia
Ali Feiruz
Mohamed Mooge Liibaan
Abdi Sinimo
Maryam Mursal
Mohamed Sulayman Tubeec

Notes

References

Somali culture
Somalian poets
1924 births
1994 deaths
Somalian Muslims